Cephetola nigeriae, the Nigerian epitola, is a butterfly in the family Lycaenidae. It is found in Nigeria (the Cross River loop), Cameroon, Gabon and the Republic of the Congo. Its habitat consists of forests.

References

Butterflies described in 1962
Poritiinae